Quercus ajoensis is an uncommon North American shrub with the common name Ajo Mountain shrub oak. It has been found in Arizona mountain ranges of the Colorado desert, and Arizona uplands of the Sonoran desert. Q. ajoensis integrates with Q. turbinella and is difficult to determine specimen identification due to hybridization. It appears that this species is an elevation variant of Q. turbinella and is best treated as a subspecies or variety as it has been treated in the past. The status of Q. ajoensis as a species is probably unnecessary due to complete integration with Q. turbinella or it being a low elevation variant of Q. turbinella.

Q. ajoensis is usually a shrub but occasionally attains the stature of small trees up to 3 metres (10 feet) tall. The leaves are narrowly egg-shaped, up to 5 centimetres (2 inches) long, with sharp pointed teeth.

The species is named for the Ajo Mountains in western Pima County, Arizona, southwest of the town of Ajo. The species does not occur as an identifiable species outside the Ajo mountain range and most specimens are of integrated types with Q. turbinella. The word "ajo" is Spanish for "garlic."

References

External links
 photo of herbarium specimen at Missouri Botanical Garden, collected in Arizona in 1952

ajoensis
Flora of Arizona
Plants described in 1954
Flora of Baja California Sur
Oaks of Mexico